Sheldon M. Schuster (born 1947) is an American biochemist, cancer researcher and academic. He is the current president of Keck Graduate Institute as of 2003. He has previously served as a professor at University of Nebraska–Lincoln and University of Florida. While at Florida, he was the director of research and the university's biotechnology program.

Early life 
Schuster was born in 1947 in San Francisco Bay Area, California where he was also raised.

He attended University of California, Davis, graduating with a bachelor's degree in biochemistry. He went on to attend a doctorate program at University of Arizona, graduating in 1974 with a PhD in biochemistry; after which, he conducted postdoctoral research at the University of Wisconsin Institute for Enzyme Research.

Career 
In 1976, Schuster began teaching chemistry and biology at the University of Nebraska–Lincoln. He continued teaching at the university until 1988, when he left to join the faculty of University of Florida.

Schuster became a professor of biochemistry and molecular biology at University of Florida in 1989. In 1992, he went on to become the director of the biotechnology program and also served as the assistant VP of research at the University of Florida (UF).

In 2000, while working at the UF Brain Institute, Weihong Tan, Schuster, Jeffery Li and Xiaohong Fang published a study on a synthetic DNA that acts like a photophore. The molecule, which illuminates when exposed to particular other molecules, can potentially be used to detect specific proteins or genes, which could allow for the detection of certain diseases.

On July 15, 2003, Schuster became the second president of Keck Graduate Institute (KGI), taking over for the founding president of the institute, Henry E. Riggs. According to the National Research Council, Schuster has helped expand KGI's Professional Science Master's Degree program "to include new centers focused on bioprocessing, rare diseases, and biomarkers."

He is currently one of the editors of the Biochemistry and Molecular Biology Education journal and a fellow of the American Association for the Advancement of Science. He has co-founded two pharmaceutical companies, AquaGene and Restoragen (previously known as BioNebraska). Schuster also serves as the vice chairman for the National Organization for Rare Disorders.

Published work

References

Sources 
 
 
 
 
 
 

American biochemists
1947 births
University of Nebraska–Lincoln faculty
University of Florida faculty
University of California, Davis alumni
University of Arizona alumni
Date of birth missing (living people)
Living people